The second season of De Férias com o Ex, a Brazilian television programme, began airing on 19 October 2017 on MTV. The series concluded on 21 December 2017 after 10 episodes. The series was confirmed in April 2017. The group of cast members for this series include Are You the One? Brasil series 1 contestant Thaigo Consani. It also features the return of Gabi Prado following her appearance in the first series of the show.

Cast 
The official list of cast members was released on 2 August 2017 and includes five single boys; Fagner Sousa, Diego Superbi, João Folsta, Nicolas Guasque and Pedro Ortega, as well as five single girls; Gabriela Domingues, Raissa Castro, Saory Cardoso, Stephanie Viegas and Gabrielle Prado.

Bold indicates original cast member; all other cast were brought into the series as an ex.

Duration of cast

 Key:  = "Cast member" is featured in this episode
 Key:  = "Cast member" arrives on the beach
 Key:  = "Cast member" has an ex arrive on the beach
 Key:  = "Cast member" arrives on the beach and has an ex arrive during the same episode
 Key:  = "Cast member" leaves the beach
 Key:  = "Cast member" does not feature in this episode

Future Appearances

After this season, Gabrielle Prado, in 2018, appeared in A Fazenda 10, she finished in 11th place in the competition.

After this season, in 2021, Claudio Matos appeared in Ilha Record, he finished in 12th place in the competition.

Episodes

References

External links
Official website 

De Férias com o Ex seasons
2017 Brazilian television seasons
Ex on the Beach